Richard Starr may refer to:
 Richard C. Starr (1924–1998), American phycologist
 Richard Dean Starr (born 1968), American entrepreneur, editor and author of fiction and graphic novels
 Dick Starr (Richard Eugene Starr, 1921–2017), Major League Baseball player
 Richard Felix Staar (1923–2018), American political scientist and historian
 Richard B. Starr, one of the architects of the Starr-Bowkett Society